Higashiya is a traditional ryokan in Shirabu Onsen village near Yonezawa city, Yamagata Prefecture, Japan. It was founded in 1312 and offers hot spring baths provided by the local onsen.

See also 
List of oldest companies

References

External links 
Homepage in Japan
Profile on Japanican.com

Hotels in Yamagata Prefecture
Companies based in Yamagata Prefecture
1310s establishments in Japan